Dalibor Gotovac (born 1 October 1979) is a Danish footballer.

Gotovac came to Denmark in 1992.

References

External links
 Boldklubben Frem profile

1979 births
Living people
Footballers from Sarajevo
Bosnia and Herzegovina emigrants to Denmark
Danish people of Serbian descent
Association football defenders
Bosnia and Herzegovina footballers
Danish men's footballers
Esbjerg fB players
Lyngby Boldklub players
Boldklubben Frem players
BK Avarta players
Fremad Amager players
Danish Superliga players
Danish 1st Division players
Danish 2nd Division players